The Northeastern Massachusetts Law Enforcement Council  or "NEMLEC" is a non-profit consortium made up of 63 police departments in Middlesex, Essex and Suffolk County and 2 County Sheriff's Departments.  Member agencies participate by sharing resources and personnel, allowing member agencies to provide supplemental services to citizens in the 925 square miles they serve. NEMLEC coordinates the mutual aid between agencies in accordance with M.G.L. Section 40, Paragraph 8G and 4J. The organization is headquartered at 314 Main Street, Suite 205 in Wilmington, Massachusetts. In 2014 its president was Michael Begonis, the chief of the Wilmington Police Department. By the next year, press reports indicated the president was John Fisher, chief of the Carlisle Police Department.

Specialized services offered by NEMLEC include:

 RRT/SWAT - Regional Response Team and SWAT Team (which includes a Crisis Negotiation Team) and K-9 Unit trained in search & rescue.
 Motor Unit - Provides escorts, traffic safety and crowd control
 CISM Team  - Critical Incident Stress Management Team
 STARS - The School Treat Assessment and Response Team is made up of police officers and licensed clinicians who respond to critical incidents at schools as well as provide threat assessments to member districts
 IMT - The Incident Management Team provides support to all NEMLEC units in terms of communications and coordinates same and operational plans for large scale events

As a private corporation, NEMLEC claimed in 2014 that it was able to keep its internal organization and operations out of the public's view. It would not respond to open records requests. Other such organizations in the state, such as the Metropolitan Law Enforcement Council, claimed the same. As a result of a lawsuit by the local branch of the American Civil Liberties Union, in 2015 it changed policy and released documents requested by the public. Days later the Washington Post published an article based on the documents describing an "excessive" use of SWAT teams for routine police matters.

Agencies that belong to NEMLEC include:

 Amesbury Police Department
 Andover Police Department
 Arlington Police Department
 Ayer Police Department
 Bedford Police Department
 Belmont Police Department
 Beverly Police Department
 Billerica Police Department
 Burlington Police Department
 Carlisle Police Department
 Chelmsford Police Department
 Concord Police Department
 Danvers Police Department
 Dracut Police Department
 Dunstable Police Department
 Essex County Sheriff's Department
 Georgetown Police Department
 Gloucester Police Department
 Groton Police Department
 Haverhill Police Department
 Ipswich Police Depaetment
 Lawrence Police Department
 Lexington Police Department
 Lincoln Police Department

 Littleton Police Department
 Lowell Police Department
 Lynnfield Police Department
 Malden Police Department
 Marblehead Police Department
 Maynard Police Department
 Medford Police Department
 Melrose Police Department
 Methuen Police Department
 Middlesex County Sheriff's Office
 Merrimac Police Department
 Newbury Police Department
 Newburyport Police Department
 Newton Police Department
 North Andover Police Department
 North Reading Police Department
 Peabody Police Department
 Pepperell Police Department
 Reading Police Department
 Rowley Police Department

 Salem Police Department
 Saugus Police Department
 Somerville Police Department
 Stoneham Police Department
 Sudbury Police Department
 Tewksbury Police Department
 Townsend Police Department
 Tyngsborough Police Department
 Wakefield Police Department
 Waltham Police Department
 Watertown Police Department
 Wenham Police Department
 Westford Police Department
 Weston Police Department
 Wilmington Police Department
 Winchester Police Department
 Winthrop Police Department
 Woburn Police Department

References

Law enforcement in Massachusetts